The I Stand tour was a tour taken by American actress and singer Idina Menzel.

Concert Synopsis
Menzel performs a diverse selection songs from her original pop album I Stand, Pop and Rock covers, as well as hits from her breakout performances on Broadway in Wicked and Rent. Throughout the concert, Menzel interacts with the audience sharing stories from inspiration of some of the songs she has written for the album, her early younger years in Long Island, NY (from quitting Hebrew School, to her parents getting divorced, and her life as a Long Island Wedding Singer before landing the role of Maureen Johnson in the original cast of Rent).

Performances
Menzel had recently released a pop album titled I Stand, and, in order to promote the album, got funds to go on tour. The album peaked at #58 on the Billboard Hot 200. On the tour, Menzel sang many songs from the album, as well as other various songs.

The tour began on April 1, 2008, performing four sold out legs. She appeared at places such as George Street Playhouse, Lincoln Center, and The Music Hall. The performance at the Lincoln Center was filmed for a PBS special on the show Soundstage.

Before being well known for appearing on the second season of The Voice, Chris Mann opened up for Menzel during the 3rd leg of the tour.

The tour continued until March 28, 2009 which afterwards Menzel took a year off from the spotlight to have a baby. Following giving birth to her son Walker Nathaniel Diggs, Menzel got offered a recurring role on the TV smash Glee and returned to the Concert stage on embarking on her Barefoot at the Symphony tour (which major symphony orchestras came in place of Menzel's 6 piece rock band).

Opening Acts
Chris Mann

Set List

"I Stand" from I Stand
"Don't Let Me Down" from I Stand
"Better to Have Loved" from I Stand
"Brave" from I Stand
"Devorah/Rise Up"
"Where Do I Begin" from I Stand
"My Own Worst Enemy" from I Stand
"Wedding Days"
"No Day But Today" from Rent
"I Feel Everything" from I Stand
"Perfume and Promises" from I Stand
"Gorgeous" from I Stand
"Defying Gravity" from Wicked

Notes
No Day But Today was not performed at the New Brunswick, NJ show on April 1, 2008.

"I Stand" from I Stand
"Don't Let Me Down" from I Stand
"Where Do I Begin" from I Stand
"Better to Have Loved" from I Stand
"Here" from Here
"Brave" from I Stand
"Roxanne" by The Police or "Heartbreaker" by Pat Benatar
"Devorah/Rise Up"
"My Own Worst Enemy" from I Stand
"Wedding Days"
"No Day But Today" from Rent
"I Feel Everything" from I Stand
"Gorgeous" from I Stand
"For Good" from Wicked
"Defying Gravity" from Wicked

Notes
Defying Gravity was performed halfway through the main set (instead of the encore) at the Santa Barbara, CA show on June 18, 2008.
Tomorrow was performed a cappella as the impromptu encore at the Santa Barbara, CA show on June 18, 2008.
Faithfully (a cover of the Journey song) was performed at the Atlantic City, NJ show only on June 26, 2008

"Don't Let Me Down"
"Here" from Here
"Heartbreaker"
"Brave" from I Stand
"Devorah/Rise Up"
"Embraceable You" by George and Ira Gershwin
"No Day But Today" from Rent
"Where Do I Begin" from I Stand
"I Feel Everything" from I Stand
"My Own Worst Enemy" from I Stand
"Company" from Company
"I Stand from I Stand/Get Up, Stand Up" by Bob Marley
"Forever" from I Stand
"For Good" from Wicked
"Gorgeous" from I Stand
"No Trace Of Us"
"Kiss From a Rose"
"Defying Gravity" from Wicked

"I Stand" from I Stand
"Don't Let Me Down" from I Stand
"Here" from Here
"Brave" from I Stand
"Heaven Help My Heart" from Chess
"Devorah/Rise Up"
"Embraceable You" by George and Ira Gershwin
"The Man That Got Away"
 "No Day But Today" from Rent
"Spiraling"
"Butterfly"
"One" 
"Still I Can't Be Still" from Still I Can't Be Still
"For Good" from Wicked
"Gorgeous" from I Stand
"No Trace Of Us" or "Company" from Company
"Defying Gravity" from Wicked

Musicians
Musical Director / Guitar: Emerson Swinford
Bass: Simon Smith
Drums: Jimmy Paxson
Keyboards: Joe Kennedy
Background Vocals and Acoustic Guitar: Holly Palmer
Background Vocals: Belle Johnson

Notes
For the April 14, 2008 show in New York City that was filmed for PBS, the band also included a string quartet expanding the sound.

Tour dates

References

http://www.playbill.com/news/article/wickeds-menzel-to-relaunch-concert-tour-in-march-156322
http://www.broadwayworld.com/article/Idina-Menzel-Fan-Club-Announces-Concert-Dates-for-March-2009-20081222
http://www.broadwayworld.com/new-jersey/article/Idina-Menzel-Performs-at-Red-Banks-Count-Basie-Theatre-321-20081210
http://www.broadwayworld.com/article/Idina-Menzel-To-Perform-at-Greenvale-NYs-Tilles-Center-20081206
http://www.playbill.com/news/article/wickeds-menzel-to-resume-concert-tour-oct.-30-154017
http://www.broadwayworld.com/article/Atlanta-Orchestra-Summer-Concert-Series-Features-Menzel-20080514
http://www.playbill.com/news/article/idina-menzel-launches-concert-tour-june-20-in-california-151065
http://www.playbill.com/news/article/venues-announced-for-idina-menzel-concert-tour-151051
http://www.playbill.com/news/article/diva-talk-catching-up-with-tony-winner-idina-menzel-plus-news-of-peters-and-150846#search_form
http://www.playbill.com/news/article/tony-winner-menzel-to-offer-london-concert-may-20-149752
http://www.playbill.com/news/article/menzel-to-play-san-diego-atlantic-city-and-more-in-june-150583
http://www.playbill.com/news/article/wickeds-menzel-to-play-manhattans-town-hall-in-june-150196
http://www.playbill.com/news/article/idina-menzel-to-launch-concert-tour-april-1-in-new-jersey-148263
http://www.playbill.com/news/article/idina-menzel-launches-concert-tour-april-1-in-new-jersey-148814

2008 concert tours
2009 concert tours
Idina Menzel concert tours